Arque Municipality is the first municipal section of the Arque Province in the Cochabamba Department, Bolivia. Its seat is Arque. At the time of census 2001 the municipality had 11,806 inhabitants. It has the lowest HDI of Bolivia with 0.311.

Geography 
Some of the highest mountains of the municipality are listed below:

Cantons 
The municipality is divided into two cantons. They are (their seats in parentheses):
 Arque Canton - (Arque)
 Colcha Canton - (Colcha)

Languages 
The languages spoken in the Arque Municipality are mainly Quechua and Spanish.

See also 
 Arque River

References 

Municipalities of the Cochabamba Department